West Clare was a UK Parliament constituency in Ireland, returning one Member of Parliament 1885–1922.

Prior to the 1885 United Kingdom general election the area was part of the Clare constituency. From 1922, on the establishment of the Irish Free State, it was not represented in the UK Parliament.

Boundaries
This constituency comprised the western part of County Clare, consisting of the baronies of Clonderalaw, Corcomroe, Ibrickan and Moyarta, and those parts of the baronies of Inchiquin and Islands not contained within the constituency of East Clare.

Members of Parliament

Elections

Elections in the 1880s

Elections in the 1890s

Elections in the 1900s

 Death of Halpin

Elections in the 1910s

References

 

Historic constituencies in County Clare
Westminster constituencies in County Clare (historic)
Dáil constituencies in the Republic of Ireland (historic)
Constituencies of the Parliament of the United Kingdom established in 1885
Constituencies of the Parliament of the United Kingdom disestablished in 1922